The Cuciurgan Reservoir (Ukrainian: Kuchurhan) is a large water reservoir, built on Kuchurhan River on the state border between Ukraine and Moldova.

The lake is located in the south-eastern part of the Left Bank of the Dniester of Moldova (de facto under Transnistria), on the border with the Odesa Oblast of Ukraine and its water resources are shared between the two countries. It was created by damming the Kuchurhan River just north of where it flows into the Dniester. The reservoir is 20 km long and has a width of 3 km at the side of the dam. It has a total water surface area of 27.2 square kilometers. Before construction of the dam, there was already a liman in the southern part of the Kuchurhan river valley.

Lake Cuciurgani is a popular resort area for the inhabitants of nearby Tiraspol, the capital of Transnistria.  The fossil fuel burning power station at Dnestrovsc utilizes water from the reservoir. There is no hydroelectric power plant associated with the dam.

References

External links 
 Map of Transnistria 
 Our Waters: Joining Hands Across Borders - First Assessment of Transboundary Rivers, Lakes and Groundwaters , UNECE (2007)
 Transboundary Diagnostic Study for the Dniester River Basin, OSCE/UNECE Project: Transboundary Co-operation and Sustainable Management of the Dniester River (November 2005)

Geography of Transnistria
Lakes of Moldova
Reservoirs in Ukraine
Moldova–Ukraine border
International lakes of Europe
Estuaries of Ukraine
Estuaries of the Black Sea
Landforms of Odesa Oblast